William J. Munley (January 6, 1883 – March 9, 1938) was an American politician.

Munley was born in Archbald, Pennsylvania and went to the Archbald local schools. He worked in the mining business. Munley then worked for the Scranton Transit Company. Munley elected as a Democrat to the Pennsylvania House of Representatives to the 1923 term; reelected to the House to serve seven consecutive terms thereafter; died while in office, March 9, 1938,  in Scranton, Pennsylvania after suffering from a heart attack.

His son Robert W. Munley and daughter-in-law Marion L. Munley also served in the Pennsylvania General Assembly.

His grandson James Martin Munley served as a United States District Court judge.

Notes

1883 births
1938 deaths
People from Lackawanna County, Pennsylvania
Democratic Party members of the Pennsylvania House of Representatives
20th-century American politicians